Othman bin Muhammad bin Hamad bin Abdullah bin Saleh bin Muhammad al-Khamees al-Nasiri al-Tamimi (born May 26, 1962), also known as Othman al-Khamees, is a jurist, academic and also a Sunni religious scholar, preacher from Kuwait.

Scientific and practical career 
Al-Khamees studied at the Imam Muhammad ibn Saud Islamic University in Riyadh, holds a master's degree in the hadith of the Prophet Muhammad, with a message on the hadiths contained in the matter of the two tribes (Al-Hasan and Al-Husayn). He holds a Ph.D. from King Saud University, with distinction, and his thesis entitled Reviews is a critical study. He worked as an imam in the Al-Hamidah Mosque from 1993 to approximately 2004, and before that he was a muezzin in the same mosque from 1989 to 1993.

He holds question and answer programs on television shows and social media, where receives questions from the public and answers them live on the TV show. Most of the questions are related to Islamic social life. 

Al-Khamees was a debater of Sunni Muslims against Shia Islam, as he criticized Shiite scholars and their analysts in many of their beliefs, and was known through his books, research and responses to the Twelver Shiites as well, Thursday afternoon through many satellite and dialogue programs that discuss and discuss issues of difference between the Islamic groups.

In the late 1990s he hosted a show on the Al Mustakillah television channel that broadcasts from London, which was hosting many of the Shiite clerics, to theorize the repercussions of the sedition of Uthman's murder and the issues of Ali and the awaited Mahdi state.

Al-Khamees participated in debates between the Twelver Shiites and Sunni Muslims in the satellite stations, and he was one of the poles of the Muslim Square militant on behalf of Sunni Muslims and the community, and their belief in the strife that prolonged after the killing of the companion and the third Rashidun Caliph Uthman bin Affan.

Personal life
He married in 1987, and has four children.

References 

 

Muslim writers
Kuwaiti writers
Imam Muhammad ibn Saud Islamic University alumni
Living people
1962 births